Janice E. Cuny, known as Jan, is an American computer scientist noted for leading efforts in broadening participation in computing.  She is a past co-chair of CRA-W: Committee on the Status of Women in Computing Research from 1997-2000.

Biography 

Cuny  received a  Ph.D in Computer Science from the University of Michigan. She was a faculty member in the Department of Computer Science at Purdue University from 1981-1983; then a faculty member at the University of Massachusetts, and then at the University of Oregon. In 2004, she became a program officer at the National Science Foundation heading the Broadening Participation in Computing Initiative, the CS 10K project and in 2016 leading the STEM + Computing Partnerships initiative.

Awards 

In 2015, she received the 2016 SIGCSE Award for Outstanding Contributions to Computer Science Education.

Her other notable awards include:
 2014 Richard Tapia Achievement Award
 2009 Woman of Vision Social Impact ABIE Award from the Anita Borg Institute.
 2007 A. Nico Habermann Award
 2003 Presidential Award for Excellence in Science, Mathematics and Engineering Mentoring (PAESMEM) - for CRA-W

References

External links

National Science Foundation: Janice Cuny, Program Officer

American women computer scientists
American computer scientists
University of Massachusetts faculty
University of Oregon faculty
Purdue University faculty
Living people
University of Michigan alumni
Year of birth missing (living people)
Computer science educators
American women academics
21st-century American women